Zurmala stupa is a remnant of the largest Buddhist stupa located in Termez district in Uzbekistan. It is considered to be the oldest construction still standing in Uzbekistan. It was built in the first or second century CE.

The stupa is 13.5m tall and has a diameter of about 14 m. It is made up of square bricks.  Each of the bricks has a stamp which is similar to one used in Bactria during the Kushan Empire in the 3rd century AD. The fragment of klined bricks can also be found around the stupa.  It is believed that the exterior facade of the stupa was painted a bright red colour. Currently, the stupa has huge cracks around it.

History
The early information about the stupa can be found in the diaries Xuan Jian, a Chinese buddhist priest who visited Termez  in 629-
630. According to him, there were more than 10 monasteries in Termez and more than  1000  monks.  He mentioned that there were many     stupas in the area. The study by A.S. Strelkov in 1926–1928 in the expedition by the Oriental Museum of Moscow and the Hermitage Museum  of  St.  Petersburg,  noted  the  similarity with the description of Xuan Jian. Later, M.E. Masson organized an expedition     to  understand the general  features of these monuments.

References

Buddhist sites in Uzbekistan
Stupas